Laila Gustavsen (born 24 October 1973) is a Norwegian politician for the Labour Party.

She served in the position of deputy representative to the Norwegian Parliament from Buskerud during the terms 2001–2005 and 2005–2009. When the second cabinet Stoltenberg assumed office following the 2005 elections, Gustavsen was appointed State Secretary in the Ministry of Labour and Social Inclusion.

References

1973 births
Living people
Deputy members of the Storting
Labour Party (Norway) politicians
Norwegian state secretaries
Buskerud politicians
Women members of the Storting
21st-century Norwegian politicians
21st-century Norwegian women politicians
Norwegian women state secretaries